Yermiya is a rural locality (a selo) in Chernushinsky District, Perm Krai, Russia. The population was 393 as of 2010. There are 5 streets.

Geography 
Yermiya is located 26 km north of Chernushka (the district's administrative centre) by road. Kutana is the nearest rural locality.

References 

Rural localities in Chernushinsky District